Pekka Tiihonen (born 29 June 1947) is a Finnish long-distance runner. He competed in the marathon at the 1972 Summer Olympics.

References

External links
 

1947 births
Living people
Athletes (track and field) at the 1972 Summer Olympics
Finnish male long-distance runners
Finnish male marathon runners
Olympic athletes of Finland
People from Nilsiä
Sportspeople from North Savo